Sri Krishnadevaraya is a 1970 Indian historical drama film in the Kannada language, produced and directed by B. R. Panthulu. It stars Rajkumar as Krishnadevaraya, an emperor of the Vijayanagara Empire in the 16th century. R. Nagendra Rao, B. R. Panthulu, Narasimharaju and N. Bharathi appear in pivotal roles. The film was Rajkumar's first in color.

The film won three awards at the 1969–70 Karnataka State Film Awards - Best Actor (B. R. Panthulu), Best Actress (N. Bharathi) and Best Music Director (T. G. Lingappa). The movie saw a theatrical run of 28 weeks.

However, B.R. Panthulu refused to accept the award. In a letter dated 23 September 1970, he cited that Rajkumar, who played Krishnadevaraya, was more eligible for the award. After this incident, the Karnataka Government started two separate category of awards - one for the lead roles and another one for the supporting roles. The movie was dubbed in Telugu in 1971 as Sri Krishnadevarayalu.

Cast 
 Rajkumar as Krishnadevaraya
 N. Bharathi as Chinna Devi
 Jayanthi as Tirumalamba Devi (Sp. Appearance)
 R. Nagendra Rao as Gajapathi Prataparudra
 R. N. Sudarshan as Panda Chieftain 
 B. R. Panthulu as Mahamantri Timmarusu
 M. V. Rajamma as Kamala, Mahamantri Timmarusu's wife
 Narasimharaju as Tenali Ramakrishna
 Mynavathi
 Chindodi Leela
 Vijayasree
 B. Jaya
 Dinesh as Achyuta Deva Raya

Soundtrack

T. G. Lingappa composed the film's music and the lyrics for the soundtrack were written by K. Prabhakara Shastry and Vijaya Narasimha. The soundtrack album comprises nine tracks.

Awards 
 Filmfare Awards South
 Filmfare Award for Best Film – Kannada (1970) 

1969–70 Karnataka State Film Awards
 Best Actor - B. R. Panthulu
 Best Actress - N. Bharathi
 Best Music Director - T. G. Lingappa
 This film screened at IFFI 1992 B R Panthalu Homage section.

References

External links 
 

1970 films
1970s Kannada-language films
Indian biographical films
Films scored by T. G. Lingappa
Films set in the 16th century
History of India on film
Films directed by B. R. Panthulu
Films set in the Vijayanagara Empire
1970s biographical films